If You Go Swimming in Tenerife is a 1964 West German comedy film directed by Helmuth M. Backhaus and starring Geneviève Cluny, Peter Kraus and Gunnar Möller.

The film's sets were designed by the art director Johannes Ott. It was shot on location in Munich and on Gran Canaria in the Canary Islands.

Synopsis
After travelling to Spain for a holiday, six young Germans discover that their travel agency has gone bust and therefore they have nowhere to stay. Instead they find employment at a local hotel, which they soon have to try and save from ruin.

Soundtrack 
The production features a number of songs including:
Peter Kraus - "Wer Dich Sieht, Evelyn"

Cast
 Geneviève Cluny as Jutta
 Peter Kraus as Tom
 Gunnar Möller as Jens
 Corny Collins as Christa
 Richard Häussler as Erik Varnhagen
 Ursula Oberst as Bessy
 as Bruni
 Heinz Erhardt as Tristan Wentzel
 Loni Heuser as Christa's Mother
 Karin Heske
 Hannes Stütz
 Ralph Persson

 Horst Pasderski
 Katrin Teleky

References

Bibliography 
 Robert C. Reimer & Reinhard Zachau. German Culture through Film: An Introduction to German Cinema. Hackett Publishing, 2017.

External links 
 

1964 films
1964 musical comedy films
German musical comedy films
West German films
1960s German-language films
Films directed by Helmuth M. Backhaus
Films shot in the Canary Islands
Films shot in Spain
Films set in the Canary Islands
Films set in Spain
1960s German films